Zenon: Girl of the 21st Century is a 1997 children's science fiction picture book written by Marilyn Sadler and illustrated by Roger Bollen.  It tells the story of Zenon Kar, a girl in the year 2049 who lives on a space station in the Milky Way. She is sent to her aunt on Earth to keep her out of trouble. She spends the summer on her grandparents' farm, learning their "old-fashioned" chores in their low-tech life. References in the novel are inspired by well-known science fiction characters.

In 1999, the book was adapted into a television film as the Disney Channel Original Movie Zenon: Girl of the 21st Century.

First edition

Series
There are five books in the Zenon, Girl of the 21st Century series:
 Zenon: Girl of the 21st Century (1997)
 Bobo Crazy: Zenon, Girl of the 21st Century (2001)
 Zenon Kar, Spaceball Star (2001)
 The Trouble with Fun (2001)
 Stuck on Earth: Zenon: Girl of the 21st Century (2002)

See also

References

1996 children's books
Zenon
Fiction set in 2049
Children's books adapted into films
American picture books